Bernard William Smith (3 October 19162 September 2011) was an Australian art historian, art critic and academic, considered the founding father of Australian art history, and one of the country's most important thinkers. His book Place, Taste and Tradition: a Study of Australian Art Since 1788 is a key text in Australian art history, and influence on Robert Hughes. Smith was associated with the Communist Party of Australia, and after leaving the party remained a prominent left-wing intellectual and Marxist thinker. Following the death of his wife in 1989, he sold much of their art collection to establish the Kate Challis RAKA, one of the first prizes in the country for Indigenous artists and writers.

Biography
Smith was born in Balmain, Sydney of Charles Smith and Rose Anne Tierney on 3 October 1916. An illegitimate child, he was a ward of the state and raised in fostered care. In 1941, he married his first wife, Kate Challis, who died in 1989. Smith married his second wife, Margaret Forster, in 1995 and subsequently separated. 

Smith was educated at the University of Sydney. Between 1935 and 1944 he taught in the NSW Department of Education. After that he served as an education officer for the Art Gallery of NSW country art exhibitions programme from 1944. In 1948, he won a scholarship to study at the Warburg and Courtauld Institutes, University of London. On his return to Australia in 1951, Smith returned to his position at the Gallery. In 1952, Smith was awarded a research scholarship at the newly established Australian National University, where he completed a PhD. A shorter version of his thesis "European Vision and the South Pacific" was published in 1950, and released as a monograph in 1960 by Oxford University Press.

He was a lecturer and then a senior lecturer in the University of Melbourne's Fine Arts Department (1955–1967). In 1959, he convened a group of seven emerging figurative painters known as the Antipodeans, which organised its only exhibition in August 1959 and with them composed The Antipodean Manifesto. Between 1963 and 1966, he worked as an art critic for The Age newspaper in Melbourne.

In 1967, the Smiths moved to Sydney, where Smith became the founding Professor of Contemporary Art and director of the Power Institute of Fine Arts, University of Sydney, a position he held until his retirement in 1977. During this time, he became involved with the art workshop known as Tin Sheds, but clashed with co-founders Marr Grounds and Donald Brooks about its role. He wanted to rename it the Fine Arts University Workshop.

In 1977, the Smiths returned to Melbourne, and Smith became the president of the Australian Academy of the Humanities, until 1980. Later, he was a professorial fellow in the department of art history at the University of Melbourne.

In 1980 he presented "The Boyer Lectures" on the theme of "The Spectre of Trunganini" which was one of the first public condemnations of the Australian government's policy of removing Australian Aboriginal and Torres Strait Islander children from their families, now known as the Stolen Generations. 

Smith was a recipient, Chevalier, of the Ordre des Arts et des Lettres.

He founded the annual Kate Challis RAKA Award, worth , in honour of his first wife.

Books 
Place, Taste and Tradition: A Study of Australian Art Since 1788. Sydney: Ure Smith, 1945 (reprinted Melbourne: Oxford University Press, 1979)
A Catalogue of Australian Oil Paintings in the National Art Gallery of New South Wales 1875–1952. Sydney: The Gallery, 1953
European Vision and the South Pacific, 1768–1850: A Study in the History of Art and Ideas. Oxford: Clarendon Press, 1960 (reprinted 1985 by Yale University Press and 2022 by Miegunyah Press)
Australian Painting Today: The John Murtagh Macrossan memorial lecture, 1961. St. Lucia, Queensland: Queensland University Press, 1962
Australian Painting, 1788–2000 Melbourne: Oxford University Press, 1962. (updated 1971; updated 1991 with Terry Smith; & update 2001 with Christopher Heathcote)
The Architectural Character of Glebe, Sydney (with Kate Smith). Sydney: University Co-operative Bookshop Press, 1973 (reprinted 1985)
Concerning Contemporary Art: the Power lectures, 1968–1973 (ed.). Oxford: Clarendon Press, 1975
Documents on Art and Taste in Australia: the colonial period, 1770–1914. (ed.) Melbourne: Oxford University Press, 1975
The Antipodean Manifesto: Essays in Art and History. Melbourne: Oxford University Press, 1975
Art as Information: Reflections on the Art from Captain Cook's Voyages. Sydney: Sydney University Press, 1979
The Spectre of Truganini. Sydney: Australian Broadcasting Commission, 1980
The Boy Adeodatus—The Portrait of a Lucky Young Bastard. Ringwood, Victoria: Allen Lane, 1984 (reprinted 1985, 1994)
The Art of Captain Cook's Voyages (with Rüdiger Joppien). Melbourne: Oxford University Press, three volumes, 1985–1987
The Death of the Artist as Hero: Essays in History and Culture. Melbourne: Oxford University Press, 1988
The Art of the First Fleet and Other Early Australian Drawings (eds Bernard Smith and Alwyne Wheeler). Melbourne: Oxford University Press, 1988
Baudin in Australian Waters: The Artwork of the French Voyage of Discovery to the Southern Lands 1800–1804 (eds J. Bonnemains, E. Forsyth and B. Smith). Melbourne: Oxford University Press, 1988
Terra Australis—The Furthest Shore (eds. W. Eisler and B. Smith). Sydney: International Cultural Corporation of Australia, 1988
The Critic as Advocate: selected essays 1941–1988. Melbourne: Oxford University Press Australia, 1989
Imagining the Pacific in the Wake of the Cook Voyages. Carlton, Victoria: Melbourne University Press at the Miegunyah Press, 1992
Noel Counihan—Artist and Revolutionary . Melbourne; New York: Oxford University Press, 1993
Poems 1938–1993. Carlton, Victoria: Meanjin, 1996
Modernism's History: A Study in Twentieth-century Art and Ideas. New Haven: Yale University Press, 1998
A Pavane for Another Time Sydney. Macmillan, 2002
The Formalesque: A Guide to Modern Art and Its History. Melbourne: Macmillan, 2007

Selected essays and articles

"European Vision and the South Pacific", Journal of the Warburg and Courtauld Institutes 8, no. 1/2 (1950): 65–100
"Coleridge's Ancient Mariner and Cook's second voyage", Journal of the Warburg and Courtauld Institutes 19, no. (1956) 117–152

"Modernism and post-modernism: neo-colonial viewpoint—concerning the sources of modernism and post-modernism in the visual arts", Thesis Eleven 38 (1994) 104–117
"Modernism, post-modernism and the formalesque", Editions 20 (1994) 9–11

Sources 
 Peter Beilharz, Imagining the Antipodes: Culture, Theory and the Visual in the Work of Bernard Smith, Melbourne: Cambridge University Press, 1997. 
International Who's Who, London: Europa Publications, 2000
The Writings of Bernard Smith: Bibliography 1938–1998 (ed. John Spencer and Peter Wright), Sydney: Power Publications, 2000
The Legacies of Bernard Smith. Essays on Australian Art, History and Cultural Politics (ed. Jaynie Anderson, Christopher Marshall and Andrew Yip), Sydney: Power Publications, 2016
 Sheridan Palmer, Hegel's Owl: The Life of Bernard Smith, Sydney: Power Publications, 2017
 Antipodean Perspective: Selected Writings of Bernard Smith, (ed. Rex Butler and Sheridan Palmer), Melbourne: Monash University Press, 2018

References

Australian art historians
Australian historians
Australian art critics
Australian painters
Alumni of the Courtauld Institute of Art
Alumni of the Warburg Institute
People from Sydney
Fellows of the Australian Academy of the Humanities
Academic staff of the University of Melbourne
University of Sydney alumni
2011 deaths
1916 births